Kimeli is both a surname and a given name. Notable people with the name include:

Isaac Kimeli (born 1994), Belgian middle-distance runner
Kipkemboi Kimeli (1966–2010), Kenyan long-distance runner
Kimeli Wilson Naiyomah, Maasai warrior
Nicholas Kimeli (born 1998), Kenyan middle-distance runner

Kenyan names